The Miss Brasil USA pageant is a beauty contest which is considered one of the biggest social events of the Brazilian community in the United States.

Winners

References
 http://gazetanews.com/colunas/conheca-as-vencedoras-do-miss-brasil-usa-2011-bastidores/
 https://web.archive.org/web/20090523041909/http://www.caras.com.br/edicoes/734/textos/a-nova-miss-brasil-usa/
 http://www.whataboutbrazil.com/miss-brazil-usa-2008/
 http://www.tribunact.com/news/2010-11-10/Community_in_Focus/Miss_BrazilUSACT_2010_beauty_pageant_is_a_great_su.html
 http://www.americantowns.com/ct/danbury/news/concurso-miss-brasil-usa-ct-2010-2602483
 http://www.clicrbs.com.br/diariocatarinense/jsp/default.jsp?uf=2&local=18&section=Geral&newsID=a3120933.htm
 http://news.jornal.us/article-5275.Miss-Brasil-USA-beauty-pageant-online-voting-begins-today-.html
 https://archive.today/20110713012043/http://www.iluvbrazil.com/2009/11/miss-brasil-usa-2009/

External links
 Official WebSite in USA
 Official WebSite in Brazil
 Winners

Beauty pageants in the United States
1992 establishments in Florida
American awards
Brazilian-American culture
Beauty pageants for people of specific ethnic or national descents